Parvis Emad (September 4, 1935 – February 16, 2023) was an Iranian-American philosopher and translator of Martin Heidegger's writings. He was the founder and co-editor of the journal  Heidegger Studies. Emad was a professor emeritus at DePaul University.

Bibliography
 Translation and Interpretation: Learning from Beitrage, with Frank Schalow, Zeta Books, 2012
 On the Way to Heidegger's Contributions to Philosophy, Madison, WI: The University of Wisconsin Press, 2007
 Heidegger and the Phenomenology of Values: His Critique of Intentionality, Walter Biemel (foreword), Tory Press, 1981
 Heidegger on Heraclitus: A New Reading (Studies in the History of Philosophy), Kenneth Maly (Author), Parvis Emad (Editor), Edwin Mellen Press, 1987

Translations
 Martin Heidegger, Mindfulness, co-trans. Thomas Kalary, London: Continuum Press, 2006
 Martin Heidegger, Contributions to Philosophy (From Enowning), co- trans. Kenneth Maly, Bloomington: Indiana University Press, 1999
 Martin Heidegger, Phenomenological Interpretation of Kant's Critique of Pure Reason, co- trans. Kenneth Maly, Bloomington: Indiana University Press, 1997
 Martin Heidegger, Hegel’s Phenomenology of Spirit, co-trans. K. Maly, Bloomington: Indiana University Press, 1988

References

Further reading
 Heidegger, Translation, and the Task of Thinking: Essays in Honor of Parvis Emad, Frank Schalow (ed.), Springer, 2011

1935 births
2023 deaths
Phenomenologists
Continental philosophers
Philosophy academics
Heidegger scholars
DePaul University faculty
University of Vienna alumni
German–English translators
20th-century translators
21st-century translators
Translators of philosophy
Translators of Martin Heidegger
20th-century Iranian philosophers
21st-century Iranian philosophers